R & R Studios is a multidisciplinary studio based in Miami, Florida, which focuses on public artworks, architecture and design of the city. This studio was founded in 1995 by the Argentinian architects Roberto Behar and Rosario Marquardt. Critic Peter Boswell describes their work in painting, installation, and architecture as three expressions of the same concept: that "an idea is both dream and obstinate reality." Boswell writes : "The works propose encounters of stories and spaces, which alternate between the private and  public, the intimate and the monumental, the quotidian and the fantastic." R & R Studios designs solutions that challenge the status quo and introduce imagination to the everyday environment.

Works include the "Big M," at the Metro mover entrance in downtown Miami. "The Living Room" structure. An oversized living room turned inside-out in a public space, a super-billboard called "Besame Mucho," which was constructed for Coachella Music and Arts Festival, and public squares in Mexico, DF and Copenhagen.

R & R Studios has received Awards of Excellence from the American Institute of Architects, and their work was selected among the best Public Art in 2007 and 2013 by Americans for the Arts. Their work has been published in over 250 publications worldwide.

Biography 

Roberto Behar and Rosario Marquardt have known one another since childhood. Behar and Marquardt received their Diplomas in Architecture from the Universidad Nacional de Rosario in Argentina. Behar also completed postgraduate study at the Institute for Architecture and Urban Studies in New York City, was a visiting artist at the Getty Research Center Academy in Rome, and a visiting professor at Harvard University and Cornell University. Behar and Rosario both teach at the University of Miami School of Architecture.

Projects 
 Emeryville Shellmound/ Powell Street. Public Art Master Plan. (work in progress)
 Roosevelt Station Plaza and Sculpture, Sound Transit, Seattle.
 I Love You. Downtown, Miami, Florida. (concept) 
 Besame Mucho. Coachella Valley Music and Arts Festival. Indio, California. 
 Rhode Island Intermodal Station. Warwick, Rhode Island. 
 Question Mark. Madison Public Central Library. Madison, Wisconsin. 
 All Together Now. Denver Urban Renewal. Denver, Colorado. 
 Peace & Love. Miami International Airport. Miami, Florida. 
 M. Miami-Dade Art in Public Places. Downtown, Miami, Florida. 
 The Peace Project. Museum of Contemporary Art. Denver, Colorado.  
 Los Pasos Perdidos. Centre International pour la Ville, L'Architecture, et le Paysage. Brussels, Belgium.  
 Cruaute et Utopie. Centre International pour la Ville, L'Architecture, et le Paysage. Brussels Belgium.
 Opa-Locka Public Art Masterplan. Opa-locka Community Development Corporation. Opa-locka, Florida.
 Sonoran Boulevard. Phoenix Office of Arts and Culture. Phoenix, Arizona. 
 Watching the wheels go round & round... Museum of Art Ft. Lauderdale. Ft. Lauderdale, Florida.
 Broward County Children's Museum. Broward County. Public Art & Design Dept. Davie, Florida.
 Time of Friendship, Madison Museum of Contemporary Art. Madison, Wisconsin. 
 Museum of Art Ft. Lauderdale. MOAFL. Ft. Lauderdale, Florida. 
 Toftegards Plads Syd. Copenhagen, Denmark.  
 Biblioteca Central. Rosario, Argentina.  
 The Most Beautiful Table in the World. Household Objects for the Pursuit of Happiness Series.  
 The Living Room. Design District, Miami, Florida.  
 Indian School Road. Scottsdale Public Art Program. Scottsdale, Arizona.
 Open Room. City of Austin. Cultural Arts Division. Austin, Texas. 
 All We Need Is Love. Miami International Airport. Miami, Florida.  
 Camelback Pedestrian Underpass. Phoenix Office of Arts and Culture. Phoenix, Arizona. 
 Streamers. Fort Lauderdale Airport Broward County Public Art & Design Dept. Ft. Lauderdale, Florida.
 Meeting Square. Charlotte Area Transit System. Charlotte, North Carolina. 
 Plaza Esperanza & Mask. Centre International pour la Ville. l’Architecture et le Paysage. Brussels, Belgium.
 Alice. Public Art Biennial. Neuberger Museum of Art. Purchase, New York. 
 Paradise Room. Miami-Dade Art in Public Places. Miami, Florida. 
 Port Everglades. Public Art & Design Master Plan. Broward Cultural Affairs Council. Fort Lauderdale, Florida. 
 The Rooms. Miami, Florida. 
 The Salon. Miami, Florida. 
 Entrance & Square. University of Miami. Coral Gables, Florida. 
 Miami Design District & Little Haiti. Public Art Master Plan. Miami, Florida.

Exhibitions 
 Time of Friendship. Museum of Art. Fort Lauderdale. Fort Lauderdale, Florida.
 The Absent City. Museum of Contemporary Art. Madison, Wisconsin. (Individual Exhibition). 
 The Peace Project. Museum of Contemporary Art Denver, Colorado. (Individual Exhibition). 
 Centre International pour la Ville, l’Architecture et le Paysage. Brussels, Belgium.

Honors 
Between 2012 and 2014, R & R Studios has won Awards of Excellence from the Miami Chapter of the American Institute of Architects for their Intermodel Station Façade in Warwick, Rhode Island, for the Museum of Art in Ft. Lauderale, and for the Toftegards Plads Syd in Copenhagen, Denmark. The Americans for the Arts Year in Review Best Public Art Projects chose R & R Studios as a leading creator of public works in both 2007 and 2014. Other honors include the Arizona Forward Award of Merit 2014, inclusion in the Austin Chronicle Best of Austin 2010, and the National Terrazzo Award given by the National Terrazzo and Mosaic Association in 2007.

Press 
 The New York Times, "Mr. and Mrs. Magritte: Living Large in Miami," by Donna Paul.  
 Bad at Sports: Contemporary Art Talk, "Episode: 501: Roberto & Rosario Marquardt," by Patricia Malone & Bryan Andrews. 
 The New York Times, "A Century-Old City Still in the Process of Being Invented," by Abby Goodnough. 
 Los Angeles Times, "Coachella 2016: Expect Extra-big Art Installations at this year's festival," by Deborah Vankin.

Publications 
 Behar, Roberto, and Rosario Marquardt. The Living Room. Miami, Florida: 2013. 
 Behar, Roberto, and Rosario Marquardt. Museum Works. Miami, Florida: 2013. 
 Behar, Roberto, and Rosario Marquardt. M. Miami, Florida: 2011. 
 Behar, Roberto, and Rosario Marquardt. The Peace Project. Miami, Florida: 2007.  
 Behar, Roberto, and Rosario Marquardt. Satellite of Love. Hotje Cantz. Verlag: Startseite, Germany: 2007.
 Behar, Roberto, and Rosario Marquardt. Here Comes the Sun. Miami, Florida: 2003.

References 

Studios in the United States